The  (also sometimes spelled as LandCruiser) is a series of four-wheel drive vehicles produced by the Japanese automobile manufacturer Toyota. It is Toyota's longest running series of models. , the sales of the Land Cruiser totalled more than 10 million units worldwide.

Production of the first generation of the Land Cruiser began in 1951. The Land Cruiser has been produced in convertible, hardtop, station wagon and cab chassis body styles. The Land Cruiser's reliability and longevity have led to huge popularity, especially in Australia, where it is the best-selling body-on-frame, four-wheel drive vehicle. Toyota also extensively tests the Land Cruiser in the Australian outback considered to be one of the toughest operating environments in both temperature and terrain. In Japan, the Land Cruiser was once exclusive to Toyota Japanese dealerships called Toyota Store.

As of 2021, the full-size Land Cruiser was available in many markets. Exceptions include the United States (since 2021), Canada (since 1996).  Malaysia (which receives the Lexus LX instead), Hong Kong, Macau, Singapore, South Korea, Brazil, and most of Europe. In Europe, the only countries where the full-size Land Cruiser is officially sold are Gibraltar, Moldova, Russia, Belarus and Ukraine.  The Land Cruiser is hugely popular in the Middle East, Russia, and Australia, and also in Africa where it is used by farmers, NGO's, UN and humanitarian organizations, by national armies (often the pickup version) as well as by irregular armed groups who turn them into 'technicals' by mounting machine guns in the rear. In August 2019, Toyota Land Cruiser cumulative global sales surpassed 10 million units.

Origin 
The Imperial Army had been using the Kurogane Type 95 four wheel drive reconnaissance car starting in 1936. When the Imperial Japanese Army occupied the Philippines in 1941, they found an American Willys MB Jeep and promptly sent it to Japan. The Japanese military authorities ordered Toyota to produce a similar vehicle but to alter the appearance. The resulting Model AK prototype led to the Yon-Shiki Kogata Kamotsu-Sha (四式小型 貨物 車 type 4 compact cargo-truck).

Later in 1941, the Japanese government instructed Toyota to produce a light truck for Japan's military. In 1942, Toyota developed the AK10 prototype by reverse-engineering a Bantam GP. The half-ton truck features an upright front grille, flat front wheel arches that angled down and back like the FJ40, headlights mounted above the wheel arches on either side of the radiator, and a folding windshield.

Unlike the U.S. Jeep, the AK10 had limited use and photographs of it in the battlefield are rare.

In June 1954, responding to claims of trademark violation by the Willys Company that produced the original Jeep, then Director of Technology Hanji Umehara renamed the vehicle "Land Cruiser."

The postwar Toyota "Jeep" BJ is completely different from the AK10 and inherits no mechanical parts from it. However, a lot of lessons learned while developing the AK10 were applied when developing the BJ.

Off-road oriented models

BJ and FJ (1951)

History 
In 1950, the Korean War created demand for a military light utility vehicle. The United States government ordered 100 vehicles with the then-new Willys specifications and tasked Toyota to manufacture them. The Toyota "Jeep" BJ prototype was developed in January 1951. This came from the demand for military-type utility vehicles, much like the British Land Rover Series 1 that was developed in 1948. It had a part-time four-wheel drive system like the Jeep. However, and unlike the Jeep, the Jeep BJ had no low-range transfer case. In July 1951, Toyota's test driver Ichiro Taira drove the next generation of the Jeep BJ prototype up to the sixth stage of Mount Fuji, the first vehicle to climb that height. The test was overseen by the National Police Agency (NPA). Impressed by this feat, the NPA quickly placed an order for 289 of these offroad vehicles, making the Jeep BJ their official patrol car.

For the first two years, manufacture was exclusively to order and in small volumes. In 1953, however, regular production of the "Toyota Jeep BJ" began at the Toyota Honsya Plant (rolling chassis assembly). The body assembly and painting was done at Arakawa Bankin Kogyo KK, later known as ARACO (now an affiliate of Toyota Auto Body Company). The "Toyota Jeep BJ" Series was introduced in the following variants:
 BJ-T (Touring),
 BJ-R (Radio),
 BJ-J (Cowl-chassis for a fire-engine).

In June 1954, the name "Land Cruiser" was coined by the technical director Hanji Umehara. "In England we had another competitor — Land Rover. I had to come up with a name for our car that would not sound less dignified than those of our competitors. That is why I decided to call it 'Land Cruiser'", he recalls. The name had already been used on the Studebaker Land Cruiser which was produced from 1934 to 1954. The , 3.9 L Type F petrol engine was added to the Land Cruiser range for the first time, originally only in the fire-engine chassis. The models were renamed:
 BJ-T (Touring),
 BJ-R (Radio),
 BJ-J (Cowl-chassis for a fire-engine),
 FJ-J (Cowl-chassis for a fire-engine).

J20, J30 (1955)

History 
 1955 The Second generation of the Land Cruiser called the 20 Series was introduced. It was designed to have a more civilian appeal than the BJ for export reasons. It also had more stylish bodywork and a better ride courtesy of longer four-plate leaf springs which had been adapted from the Toyota Light Truck. It had a more powerful  3.9 L six-cylinder Type F petrol engine, but adopted the previous generation's three-speed gearbox. The interior of the vehicles were made more comfortable by moving the engine  forward. The 20 Series still had no low range transfer case, but had synchronism on the third and fourth gears.
 1957 A 4-door Station Wagon was added called the FJ35V which was based on a  wheelbase. The Land Cruiser first imported into Australia by B&D Motors as the FJ25/28 cab chassis with Australian made bodies. The Land Cruiser was the first Japanese vehicle to be regularly exported to the country. A small number of Land Cruisers were initially used in the Snowy Mountains Scheme by contractor Theiss Constructions.
 1958 FJ25 production commenced in Brazil; this being the first Toyota vehicle built outside Japan. These were sold as the "Toyota Bandeirante" from January 1962 when the Toyota petrol engine was replaced with a Mercedes-Benz diesel engine. The word "bandeirante" means "flag carrier" in Portuguese.  The FJ25 models were built until August 1968 in Brazil. Production numbers were fairly low; in 1965, the production total was 961 vehicles.

Bandeirante timeline 
 1959:
 FJ25 Short open (topless) bushdrive car Toyota F engine (May 1959 to 1960/61) new in 1959 (also referred to as FJ251)
 1960/1961:
 FJ25L Short soft top bushdrive car Toyota F engine (1960/1961 to 1960/1961) new in 1960/1961 (also referred to as FJ251L)
 FJ151L Short soft top bushdrive car Toyota 2F engine (1960/1961 to December 1961) replaces the FJ25/FJ251 and the FJ25L/FJ251L (there are few mentions in literature and no preserved ones known; it could be even doubted if it's ever been actually built)
 1962:
 TB25L Short soft top bushdrive car Mercedes-Benz OM-324 engine (January 1962 to 1966?) replaces the FJ151L (or FJ25L/FJ251L?)
 TB25L Short hard top bushdrive car Mercedes-Benz OM-324 engine (January 1962 to 1966?) new in 1962
 TB41L Long hard top bushdrive car  Mercedes-Benz OM-324 engine (September 1962 to July 1968) new in 1962
 TB51L Short pickup with native bed Mercedes-Benz OM-324 engine (September 1962 to January 1966)
 1965:
 TB51L3 Short 3-door double cabin pickup with native bed and steel bed cover Mercedes-Benz OM-324 engine (1965 to ?) new in 1965; possibly only one unit was built
 1962–1968:
 OJ32L Short soft top bushdrive car Mercedes-Benz OM-324 engine (1966? to August 1968) replaces the soft top TB25L
 OJ31L Short hard top bushdrive car Mercedes-Benz OM-324 engine (1966? to August 1968) replaces the hard top TB25L
 TB81L Short pickup with native bed Mercedes-Benz OM-324 engine (February 1966 to August 1968) replaces the TB51L

J40 (1960)

History 
 1960 The 20 Series was upgraded to the now classic 40 Series. Toyota made many production changes by buying new steel presses. Mechanically, the FJ40 was given a new , 3.9 L F engine and the Land Cruiser finally received low-range gearing, but continued the three-speed main gearbox.
 1965 Global production surpassed 50,000 vehicles. The Land Cruiser was the best selling Toyota vehicle in the United States.
 1968 The 100,000th Land Cruiser was sold worldwide. Brazilian J40 production, as the Bandeirante, commenced in September.
 1972 The 200,000th Land Cruiser was sold.
 1973 The 300,000th Land Cruiser was sold. The first diesel Land Cruiser was introduced for export based on a long wheelbase with a six-cylinder H engine.
 1974 A four-cylinder 3.0 L B diesel engine was offered. The introduction of this engine boosted sales in Japan by putting the Land Cruiser in a lower tax compact freight-car category as compared to the 3.9 L petrol version. 
Note: the new B diesel engine was different from the B petrol engine used in the original BJ.
 1975 The 3.9 L petrol engine was replaced by a larger, more powerful 4.2 L 2F unit and the FJ55 received front disc brakes. The 3.6 L H diesel engine was optional in some markets in the HJ45.
 1976 FJ40 Land Cruiser (United States-version) received front disc brakes like the FJ55. The Toyota Land Cruiser Association was founded in California.
 1977 The Irish Army took delivery of the first of 77 FJ45 Land Cruisers. Although fast, reliable and with good off-road performance the vehicle tended to rust excessively in the wet Irish climate. A few which did not succumb to the effects of weather were repainted in gloss olive green and survive as ceremonial gun tractors at military funerals. 
 1978 The first BJ/FJ40 and FJ55 models were officially sold in West Germany with both diesel (BJ40) and petrol engines (FJ40/55).
 1979 FJ40 (United States-version) was updated this year with a new wider, square bezel surrounding the headlights. Power steering and cooler were offered in FJ40 for the first time The diesel engine was improved, evolving into the 3.2 L 2B unit but only in Japanese markets.
 1980 The H diesel engine (HJ45) was replaced by the 4.0 L 2H engine (now with chassis code HJ47).
 1981 the Diesel version received front disc brakes and the more powerful 3.4 L 3B engine, and the LWB BJ45 with 3B engine was added to the range.
 1983 the last FJ40s imported to the U.S. were 1983 models (mid-1982 to mid-1983). It is unknown how many were imported by Toyota, but many guess the number to be around 300. The 1983 FJ40s typically bring a premium for their rarity, though they are not much different from 1982 models (mid-1981 to mid-1982).
 1984 the North American market was limited to Canada with the BJ42, which had a 5-speed (overdrive) transmission that was widely sought.

Gallery

J70 (1984)

History 
 1984 J70 was introduced as a soft-top, hard-top, Fibre-reinforced plastic top, utility, cab-chassis, and Troop Carrier (inward facing rear seats). The petrol engine was replaced with a 4.0 L 3F engine. The 70 Light had a four-wheel coil spring solid-axle suspension for better ride quality. This lighter duty version of the Land Cruiser had the 22R 2.4 L four-stroke petrol engine, which actually were the 2L and 2L-T (turbocharged) 2.4 L diesel engines commonly found in the Toyota Hilux. The 70 Light was sold in some markets as the Bundera or the Landcruiser II, later called 70 Prado. The 70 Prado eventually became popular and evolved into the Toyota Land Cruiser Prado (J90). An automatic transmission (A440F) was introduced making it the first four-wheel drive Japanese vehicle with an automatic transmission.
 1990 New-generation of diesel engines were introduced for the Land Cruiser including a 3.4 L five-cylinder SOHC naturally aspirated engine (1PZ), and a 4.2 L six-cylinder SOHC naturally aspirated engine (designated the 1 HZ).
 1993 to 1996 the KZ 3.0 L turbocharged diesel engine replaced the LJ in the 70 series in European markets where this model was known as the KZJ70. 
 1993 An advanced 24-valve, 4.5 L six-cylinder petrol engine, 1FZ-FE was introduced.
 1999 Toyota updated the 70 series in several ways. The solid front axle received coil-spring suspension. The rear leaf springs were lengthened for increased ride comfort and wheel travel. The six-bolt wheels were replaced with five-bolt wheels. Several smaller modifications to the drivetrain provided increased durability. The long-wheel-base models received new designations: 78 for the troop carrier, and 79 for the pickup.
 2002 — HDJ79 was introduced to Australia with the 1HD-FTE 4.2 L six-cylinder 24-valve turbodiesel EFI engine.
 2007 Toyota's first turbodiesel V8 engine, the 1VD-FTV was introduced in some countries for the 70 Series Land Cruiser. Other modifications include the addition of a 4-door medium-wheel-base model (the 76) and an updated front-end on all models.
 2012 the 79 Double Cab pickup was introduced in the South African markets (with the 4.2 L diesel or 4.0 L petrol engines) and in the Australian market (with 4.5 L V8 Diesel engine).
 2014 to 2015 the 30th Anniversary Series 70 sold in Japan as a 4-door wagon or 4-door pickup with the 1GR-FE V6 petrol engine and 5-speed manual transmission.

The Sixth and Seventh generations of the Land Cruiser are still being produced and sold in African and Latin American regions. Production of the Land Cruiser in Venezuela ended in 2008.

The 70 series is also still marketed in Australia as 4-door wagon, 2-door 'Troop Carrier', 2-door cab-chassis and 4-door cab-chassis.

The 70 series is also still being marketed in the Middle East as a 2-door and 4-door version as an SUV, and a 2-door and 4-door version as a pickup, and it is very popular there along with the regular Land Cruiser.

Gallery

Comfort oriented models

J50 (1967) 

The Land Cruiser 55 was produced from 1967 to 1980. Toyota refers to the FJ55G and FJ55V as the first "real" station wagon in the Land Cruiser series, thus marking the beginning of the station wagon bodystyle. It was the first Land Cruiser to have fully enclosed box frame members. Of all the Land Cruiser wagons sold in the U.S., including the FJ45, it is the only one to not have hatch and tailgate in the rear, but rather a tailgate only with an electrically operated window that can be retracted into the tailgate.

History 
 1967 Production of the FJ55 began. The FJ55 was a 4-door station wagon version based on the FJ40's Drive-train, replacing the 4-Door FJ45V (I). It was colloquially known as the "Moose". It has also been referred to as a "pig" or an "iron pig". The FJ55 had a longer wheelbase (at ) and was mainly designed to be sold in North America and Australia. Fire engine versions were also available, using the regular front clip but with open bodywork and no doors.
 1975 January 1975 saw the F series engine being replaced by the 2F engine. Unusual for Toyota, the model designation (e.g. FJ55) did not change, except in Japan, where it was changed to FJ56.
 July 1980 Production ends.

Gallery

J60 (1980) 

The Land Cruiser 60 series was produced from 1980 through 1990, for most markets but the Cumana Plant in Venezuela continued production until 1992 for their local market. It is a front engine, four-door wagon which can seat five to eight people. The 60 series was available in the following exterior colours: Alpine White, Brown, Desert Beige, Freeborn Red, Royal Blue; and in the following metallic exterior colours: Charcoal Gray, Cognac, Gray-Blue, Rootbeer, Sky Blue, Stardust Silver.

History 
 1980 — The 60 series was introduced. While still retaining the rugged off-road characteristics of previous Land Cruisers, the 60 was designed to better compete in the emerging sport utility vehicle market. The 60 was given a variety of creature comforts like air conditioning, a rear heater and an upgraded interior. The FJ60's "2F" petrol engine was left unchanged from the "40" series while the six-cylinder 4.0 L 2H and the four-cylinder 3.4 L 3B diesel engines were added to the lineage. Less equipped versions were also available in many markets. In Europe this model was sold as the Land Cruiser Wagon Van.
 1981 Land Cruiser sales surpassed 1 million and a high-roof version was introduced. The 60 series was introduced to South Africa when a stock Land Cruiser competed in the Toyota 1000 km Desert Race in the punishing wilds of Botswana.
 1984 This was the final year for the 40 series.
 1984 Alongside the 60 series, the 70 series was introduced.
 1985 The Direct-injection 12H-T turbodiesel engine was introduced.
 1988 The petrol engine was upgraded in some countries to a 4.0 L 3F-E EFI engine or to a 4.0 L 3F carburated engine. The FJ62G VX-Series was introduced allowing the Land Cruiser to be sold in Japan as a passenger vehicle.
 1992 – Last FJ62 with a 4.0 L 3F carburated engine was built in Venezuela which was the only country producing the vehicles after production ended in Japan in 1990.

Gallery

J80 (1990) 

The Land Cruiser 80 series was unveiled in October 1989 at the Tokyo Motor Show and launched in early 1990. It had swing-out back doors, which were replaced by a tailgate and hatch in 1994. The Land Cruiser was nicknamed the Burbuja (Bubble) in Colombia and Venezuela due to its roundness. The J80 was initially offered in two versions in these countries: the fully loaded VX and an entry level model that included a vinyl interior with optional air conditioning. In 1996, the entry model was upgraded to a medium equipped model named Autana, including cloth upholstery, standard air conditioning and power driver seat. The name is a reference to the Tepui mesa Autana, a spectacular plateau and cave system along the Guiana Shield craton. Land Cruiser sales reached 2 million vehicles.

History 
 1990 The 80 series station wagon was introduced, replacing the 60 series. All 80s sold in North America and Europe now have a full-time four-wheel drive system. In Japan, Africa, and Australia, a part-time system was still available. 80s produced between 1990 and 1991 had an open centre differential which was lockable in 4HI and automatically locked in 4LO. From 1992 onward, vehicles with anti-lock brakes had a viscous coupling that sent a maximum of 30% torque to the non-slipping axle. The differential was lockable in 4HI and automatically locked in 4LO.
 1990 A new generation of diesel engines were introduced, adding to the engines available in the 80 series. The 80 series came with either a (3F-E) six-cylinder naturally aspirated petrol engine, a six-cylinder SOHC naturally aspirated diesel engine, (1HZ), or a 1HD-T direct injection turbo diesel.
 1991 By mid-1991 the 3F-E engine was introduced to the Australian market, a fuel injected version of the 3F engine.
 1993 An advanced 24-valve, 4.5 L six-cylinder petrol engine, 1FZ-FE was introduced. Larger brakes were added from October 1992 and the total wheelbase was made slightly longer. Front and rear axle lockers (code k294) were available as an option. The High Pinion Electric Locking front differential became available in the US models. In May 1993, Toyota began using R134 refrigerant in the air conditioning system. Serial numbers lower than JT3DJ81xxxxx38947 use the R12 refrigerant.
 1994 A limited edition called the Land Cruiser Blue Marlin (FZJ80) was introduced to the Australian market. The car is blue from the Blue Marlin fish and they have the Blue Marlin logo throughout the car. Some of the features that the Blue Marlin included were altimeters, power windows, disc brakes, leather gear knob and steering wheel, central locking, leather trim, chrome handles and sidesteps, 16-inch alloy wheels, limited-slip differential, anti-lock brakes (ABS), power steering, CD or cassette players, fender flares, and a limited edition bull bar. Only 500 were made.
 1995 Driver and passenger airbags were introduced as were adjustable shoulder-belt anchors and an anti-lock braking system. The "T O Y O T A" badge was replaced with the modern, ovoid Toyota logo.
 1996 In the Dakar Rally, a pair of Land Cruisers finished first and second in the unmodified production class. North American and British models adopted anti-lock brakes and airbags as standard equipment. The Land Cruiser was withdrawn from Canada this year and was replaced by the more luxurious Lexus LX 450.
 1997 A limited run of Land Cruiser 80 was built specifically for collectors and is therefore called the Land Cruiser Collector's Edition. The Collector's Edition has Collectors Edition badging, "Collector's Edition" embroidered floor mats, automatic climate control, wheels with the "D" windows painted dark grey and special grey side moldings along with black pearl badging. The Collector's Edition was only available for the 1997 model year and the package was added to many of the available body colours.
 1997 A total of 4,744 FZJ80 Land Cruisers were sold in the United States as "40th Anniversary Limited Edition" models. They were available in 2 colours; Antique Sage Pearl (often referred to as Riverrock, Pewter, or Grey) and Emerald Green. The 40th Anniversary models included apron badges, a serial number badge on the centre console, black pearl exterior badges, "40th Anniversary Limited Edition" embroidered floor mats, automatic climate control, two-tone tan and brown leather interiors, and wheels with the "D" windows painted dark gray. Many were manufactured with the optional electric front and rear locking differentials, keyless entry, port-installed roof racks and running boards. There are some examples that did not have many of these optional extras. This was the last year for the electric locking front differentials.
 2007 Last 80-Series models was built in Venezuela which was the only country producing the vehicles after production ended in Japan in 1997.

Gallery

R means Right-hand drive version, excluding Japanese domestic market.

J100 (1998) 

In January 1998, the 100 series Land Cruiser was introduced to replace the 8-year-old 80 series. The 100 series was previewed in October 1997 as the "Grand Cruiser" at the 32nd Tokyo Motor Show. Development began in 1991 under code name 404T, with the final design being frozen in mid-1994.

There are two distinct versions of the 100-series, the 100 and the 105. The two versions look very similar, but there are significant differences under the bodywork. Despite these differences and official model names, both the 100 and 105 are collectively known as the 100 series.

The 105 carried over the majority of its chassis and powertrain from the 80-series with coil suspended solid axles front and rear, and straight-6 petrol and diesel engines. These models were only sold in African, Australian, Russian, and South American markets.

In 1998, a suspension system combining Active Height Control (AHC) and Skyhook TEMS Toyota Electronic Modulated Suspension on the Land Cruiser J100 was introduced.

In 2002, Toyota introduced Night View, the first worldwide series production active automotive night vision system, on the Toyota Land Cruiser Cygnus or Lexus LX470. This system uses the headlight projectors emitting near infrared light aimed like the car's highbeam headlights and a CCD camera then captures that reflected radiation, this signal is then processed by a computer which produces a black-and-white image which is projected on the lower section of the windshield. It was also the first Toyota vehicle with roll-over sensor and control logic.

The 100 models were fitted with a slightly wider chassis, independent front suspension (IFS) and two new engines. The change to IFS was a first for a Land Cruiser, and was made (in combination with rack-and-pinion steering) to improve on-road handling. However it also limited the vehicle's off-road capability and durability, hence the decision to offer the solid axle 105 models alongside the IFS 100 models in some markets was made. The table below identifies the range of 100 and 105 models and their worldwide availability.

Despite the 100 and 105 bodies being very similar, there are some exterior visual indications between both models. The most obvious is the front end of the vehicle often appearing lower than the rear on the 100 models, due to the IFS. The other indicator is the design of the wheels. The 100 models have almost flat wheel designs, while the 105 models have dished wheels. This difference allows both versions to retain similar wheel tracks, despite the 100 having a relatively wider axle track to allow for the IFS system.

The introduction of a V8 engine was also a first for a Land Cruiser, and was specifically intended to improve sales in the North-American market, where it was the only engine available. In Australia, the 100 V8 was initially only available in the range-topping GXV model, while entry and mid-range models were the 105 powered by the 1FZ-FE I6 petrol, or 1HZ diesel engines. The new 1HD-FTE turbo-diesel 100 was added to the Australian range in October 2000 after being available in Europe and the UK since the vehicle's launch in 1998. The automotive press in Australia were critical of Toyota's decision to offer the acclaimed 1HD-FTE engine only in combination with IFS. Australian 4WD Monthly magazine stated "We will never forgive Toyota for going independent at the front with the mighty 4.2 turbo-diesel".

The 100 series formed the basis for the Lexus LX 470, which was also sold in Japan as the Toyota Cygnus.

The 100 series was called the Toyota Land Cruiser Amazon in the UK and Ireland from 1998 to 2007.

In 2000, Toyota celebrated the 50th anniversary of the Land Cruiser with commemorative models offered in several countries. Total global production to date was 3.72 million vehicles.

The 100 series remained in production until late 2007, with several minor facelifts such as headlights, taillights, front grille, rear spoiler and specification changes introduced over the years.

*This engine was not introduced in Australia until 2000.

The 100-series is generally considered a durable and reliable vehicle, however there have been three known issues identified, generally for vehicles operating in harsh conditions:
 The IFS 100-series gained a reputation for front suspension failures in operating conditions where the front suspension was prone to hitting the bump stops. Several companies produce strengthened lower wishbones to prevent cracks from developing.
 Both the IFS 100 and Live-axle 105 models have been reported to be suffering from broken front differential centres when driven in harsh conditions. The most common front differential failures in IFS models are reported in vehicles produced between mid-1997 and mid-1999 (i.e. the model years 1998 and 1999), when Toyota fitted the 100 Series IFS with a 2-pinion front differential (the pinion gear would flex away from the ring gear under shock loads). In 1999 (model year 2000) the IFS Landcruiser received a 4-pinion front differential that was more robust fewer failures were reported.

Gallery

J200 (2007) 

In 2002, a 5-year development plan on a successor to the 100-series platform commenced under Sadayoshi Koyari and Tetsuya Tada. By 2004, 10 years after the design selection of its predecessor in 1994, a final production design was settled on for the 2008 J200. Prototype related tests were conducted for over 2 years between 2004 and early 2007. The redesigned Toyota Land Cruiser was introduced in late 2007. Known as the 200 Series, it shares the Lexus LX 570's platform and overall design. The frame was new, derived from the second-generation Tundra but shortened and strengthened by 20 percent. Bigger brake rotors and calipers were added and the front suspension was strengthened. The underbelly is also protected by skid plates. The roof pillars were redesigned to better protect occupants in a rollover.

The 200 Series encountered some criticism due to its bland body restyling, with some claiming that Toyota has 'overdeveloped' the classic trademarked Land Cruiser identity in its efforts to fit the Land Cruiser into modern 21st century motoring and vehicle design.

The vehicle entered production in September 2007 and was available for sale from September or November, depending on country. It became available in Venezuela for sale in early November of the same year under the local nickname of "Roraima" (taken from Mount Roraima).

The 200 Series, offered numerous features and upgrades over its predecessor not limited to the cosmetic changes made to the body and interior, including:
 Smart Entry — A sensor is triggered when the remote is brought near the vehicle, allowing the user to simply touch the door handle to open it.
 Smart Start — Start/Stop push button for ignition; a key is not required.
 4-zone climate control on Sahara models, with outlet vents increased from 18 to 28
 10 airbags (VX & Sahara)
 A stronger and lighter frame

Various driver assist technologies not offered on previous models are included as standard, including:
 CRAWL, a four-wheel drive control system that operates like an off-road cruise control, automatically maintaining a low uniform vehicle speed using brakes and throttle
 Downhill Assist Control
 Multi-terrain anti-lock braking system (ABS)
 Kinetic Dynamic Suspension System (KDSS), allows for greater wheel articulation
 An optional rear-view camera (VX)
 Leather seats are available in full option (VX)

Engine and transmission improvements include:
 An all new optional V8 diesel engine, the Toyota VD engine (a twin-turbocharged version of the engine used in the 70 Series since 2007).
 Automatic transmission included as standard across all levels of trim of the 200 Series, a five-speed manual transmission is offered only with the 4.0 L GX models (in selected regions). A five-speed automatic gearbox is assigned to the 4.7 L petrol models, while the 4.5 L diesel models receive a six-speed automatic.

In Japan, the Land Cruiser had an update in 2009 when it received the 4.6 L V8 1UR-FE engine and the gearbox was replaced with a 6-speed automatic.

In the Middle East, the Land Cruiser 200 series was introduced in late 2007 as a 2008 model, for 2008 to 2010 there was three engine choices:
  4.0 L 1GR-FE petrol engine
  2UZ-FE petrol engine
  1VD-FTV 4.5 L turbo diesel engine

In Europe and Asia, the Euro4 diesel (2007-2010) model had .

Starting in 2011, the  3UR-FE engine was offered along with the previous engines. For 2012, the 1GR-FE gained dual VVT-i and power 

Beige or black leather upholstery is standard along with a 14 speaker JBL sound system. The only wheel choice is  allowing a lot of sidewall so the vehicle can be driven off-road without modification though a more aggressive tread pattern is advised for deep mud.

For the 2013 model year, Toyota added all previously optional safety and luxury options as standard. The Land Cruiser now gets pushbutton start, HID headlights with beam level adjustment, a power moonroof, automatic rain sensing windshield wipers, heated and ventilated (perforated leather) front and only heated rear seats, a rear-seat DVD entertainment system, bluetooth, rearview camera with parking sensors, navigation system, HD radio and Entune. Another new feature is the Multi-terrain Select system which helps control wheelspin and brake lockup giving the selectable choices of: Rock, Rock & Dirt, Mogul, Loose Rock, and Mud & Sand and with an addition to the Multi-terrain Select system a feature known as adaptive Anti-lock Braking system which adapts to the condition of the road like mud or sand and efficiently uses the ABS to reduce braking distance on any type of terrain.

In Oceania, the 200 Series is offered in four different levels of trim: GX, GXL, VX and Sahara.

In August 2015, Toyota launched an updated, face-lifted version of the J200 Land Cruiser in Japan, which was later sold globally. This version first appeared in the United States in 2015 for the 2016 model year. The new version has several mechanical changes, including a new 8-speed electronically controlled automatic transmission (ECT-i) mated to the original 5.7 L 3UR-FE V8 petrol engine, larger front disc brakes, and a higher axle ratio (3.30:1 vs 3.90:1 in the previous years). Updates to the front fascia, grill, headlamps (with daylight running lamps), rear tail lamps and bumpers were the main exterior highlights of the facelift. Interior changes included a new multimedia system and interface with larger screens front and back, as well as refreshed interior styling.

In China, the Land Cruiser 200 was produced from 2008 to 2016 by Sichuan FAW Toyota Motor. The 4.0 L 1GR-FE V6 and 4.7 L 2UZ-FE V8 were the available engine choices both paired to a 5-speed automatic gearbox. Trim levels were the 4.0 GX-R, 4.0 VX, 4.7 VX and 4.7 VX-R.

In February 2019, Toyota introduced a Heritage edition of the Land Cruiser at the Chicago Auto Show as part of the 60th anniversary of the introduction of the FJ40. Toyota will only build 1200 vehicles and they will only be available as a 5-seater sold in the United States. Sales are expected to begin in the third quarter of 2019 for the 2020 model year.

In December 2020, Toyota confirmed to Road & Track that the Land Cruiser would be discontinued in North America after 2021.

Gallery

J300 (2021) 

The J300 series Land Cruiser was unveiled on 9 June 2021. Its development was led by Toyota chief engineer Takami Yokoo. Built on the body-on-frame GA-F platform, the frame itself was redesigned to reduce weight and increase rigidity. The total weight of the vehicle was reduced by  compared to its predecessor. Other improvements claimed include lowered center of gravity, weight distribution, and an improved suspension structure.

Exterior dimensions including the total length, total width, and wheelbase, as well as both the departure and approach angles have been kept largely same as the previous model to retain its off-road performance. It carries over the approach angle of 32 degrees from its predecessor. The departure angle can reach up to 26.5 degrees depending on the version, while ground clearance measures . Toyota has equipped the vehicle with an adaptive variable suspension (AVS), an upgraded Electronic Kinetic Dynamic Suspension System (E-KDSS), a more advanced Multi-Terrain Select system with Deep Snow and Auto modes, and a Multi-Terrain Monitor system which incorporates an underbody camera.

For this generation, Toyota ceased to offer V8 engine options in favour of a  V35A-FTS twin-turbocharged V6 petrol engine producing , and a 3.3-litre F33A-FTV twin-turbocharged V6 diesel engine producing . A 4.0-litre naturally-aspirated V6 engine is carried over from the previous model.

A GR Sport/GR-S variant is also available for the first time. It is  shorter than the standard model, and uses more body adhesive to enhance structural rigidity. The GR Sport model also offers front and rear differential locking, as opposed to only centre locking in the standard 300 Series.

It went on sale in the United Arab Emirates and Kuwait on 20 June 2021, in Japan on 2 August 2021, in Australia on 5 October 2021, and in Indonesia on 13 January 2022. The Japanese model is available in four 7-seat petrol grades: AX, VX, GR Sport and ZX, one 5-seat petrol grade: GX and two 5-seat diesel grades: GR Sport and ZX. The Australian model is available in six grades: GX, GXL, VX, Sahara, GR Sport and Sahara ZX. The Indonesian model is available in two grades: VX-R and GR-S.

Toyota stated that the J300 series Land Cruiser would not be available in the United States due to slow sales for its J200 series predecessor, as well as limited production capacity; the related Lexus LX remains available due to better sales. Other than Lexus vehicles, the Sequoia became Toyota's flagship SUV sold in North America.

Sales

Use by militant groups and military forces 

Owing to its durability and reliability, the Land Cruiser, along with the smaller Toyota Hilux, has become popular among militant groups in war-torn regions. U.S. counter-terror officials enquired of Toyota how the extremist group Islamic State had apparently acquired large numbers of Toyota Land Cruisers and Hiluxes. Mark Wallace, the CEO of the Counter Extremism Project said, "Regrettably, the Toyota Land Cruiser and Hilux have effectively become almost part of the ISIS brand."

References

Further reading 
 
 Videos

External links 

  (global)
 Toyota Land Cruiser data Library

 
Land Cruiser
Cars introduced in 1951
1960s cars
1970s cars
1980s cars
1990s cars
2000s cars
2010s cars
2020s cars
All-wheel-drive vehicles
Full-size sport utility vehicles
Luxury sport utility vehicles
Off-road vehicles
Flagship vehicles